is a Japanese manga artist, notable for illustrating the Clannad manga. She is also known by the nickname .

External links
Juri Misaki's personal website 

Manga artists
1980 births
Living people
Place of birth missing (living people)
21st-century Japanese artists
21st-century Japanese women artists